He Walks Beside Me: Favorite Songs of Faith and Inspiration is an Elvis Presley gospel album released by RCA Records (AFL1-2772) on February 13, 1978. The album was made up of previously released music recorded from 1966 to 1971. The album peaked at #113 on the Billboard 200 albums chart on June 9, 1978.

Track listing 
Side 1:

 He Is My Everything
 Miracle of the Rosary
 Where Did They Go Lord
 Somebody Bigger Than You or I
 An Evening Prayer
 The Impossible Dream

Side 2:

 If I Can Dream
 Padre
 Known Only to Him
 Who Am I
 How Great Thou Art

References 

Elvis Presley albums
Gospel albums
1978 albums
RCA Records albums